Widów  is a village in the administrative district of Gmina Rudziniec, within Gliwice County, Silesian Voivodeship, in southern Poland.

The village has a population of 317.

The oldest known mention of the village comes from 1305, when it was part of Piast-ruled Poland. It was the location of a motte-and-bailey castle from the 14th century, which is now an archaeological site. In 1970, archaeologists found medieval pottery at the site.

Transport
The Polish A4 motorway runs nearby, south of the village.

References

Villages in Gliwice County
Archaeological sites in Poland